Axel Danielsson (15 December 1863, Värmland – 30 December 1899, Elsterberg, Germany) was a Swedish socialist agitator, journalist and writer. He was a prominent leader of the early Swedish Social Democratic Party. Danielsson retranslated Karl Marx's The Communist Manifesto into Swedish in 1886.

Danielsson faced legal charges of blasphemy for a controversial article published in Hjalmar Branting's Social-Demokraten: the legal process culminated in the conviction of both men. Imprisoned in 1888, Danielsson celebrated the event by composing a pamphlet on the labour theory of value while serving out his sentence. During his imprisonment, his paper was managed by his fiancée, Elma Danielsson.

References

External links
August Palm, Axel Danielsson, "The Labor Issue" in Social-Demokraten, September 25, 1885 (at Marxists.org)

1863 births
1899 deaths
Marxist journalists
People convicted of blasphemy
People from Arvika Municipality
Swedish journalists
Swedish Social Democratic Party politicians
19th-century journalists
Male journalists
19th-century male writers